The Solo technical routine competition at the 2022 World Aquatics Championships was held on 17 and 18 June 2022.

Results
The preliminary round was started on 17 June at 09:00. The final was held on 18 June at 16:00.

Green denotes finalists

References

Solo technical routine